Agni Prem is a 1996 Bollywood romance drama film directed by S. Rukan, starring Shatrughan Sinha, Johnny Lever, Rohini Hattangadi and Farheen. The film was released on 26 April 1996 under the banner of Minar Production.

Plot
The story of Agnee Prem revolves around two young lovers Sangeeta daughter of a rich business man Seth Deen Dayal and Rahul who hails from a middle-class family.

Cast
Shatrughan Sinha as Shankar
Rajat as Rahul
Farheen as Sangeeta
Aasif Sheikh
Mushtaq Khan
Tinu Anand as Seth Deen Dayal
Rohini Hattangadi as Mrs. Dayal
Johnny Lever
Birbal

Soundtrack
The music of the film was composed by Bappi Lahiri.

"Ishq Mein Jeena Ishq Mein Marna" - Nitin Mukesh, Mohammed Aziz
"Jaan Banke Rahenge" - Kavita Krishnamurthy, Udit Narayan
"Madam Madam Bolo" - Sapna Mukherjee, Sudesh Bhosle
"Mujhe To Pyar Pyar" - Alka Yagnik
"Prem Agni Prem" - Bappi Lahiri
"Roshni Chand Se" - Kavita Krishnamurthy
"Roshni Chand Se v2" - Kavita Krishnamurthy
"Saajan Ko Mera Salaam" - Kavita Krishnamurthy

References

External links
 

1996 films
1990s Hindi-language films
Films scored by Bappi Lahiri
Indian romantic drama films